One Tree Hill is an American drama television series created by Mark Schwahn, which premiered on September 23, 2003, on The WB. After the series' third season, The WB merged with UPN to form The CW, and from September 27, 2006, the series was broadcast by The CW in the United States until the end of its run in 2012. The show is set in the fictional town of Tree Hill in North Carolina and initially follows the lives of two half-brothers, Lucas Scott (Chad Michael Murray) and Nathan Scott (James Lafferty), who compete for positions on their school's basketball team, and the drama that ensues from the brothers' romances.

Most of the filming took place in and around Wilmington, North Carolina. Many of the scenes were shot near the battleship USS North Carolina and on the University of North Carolina Wilmington campus. The first four seasons of the show focus on the main characters' lives through their high school years. Within these seasons we see the characters build unexpected relationships as they face the challenges of growing up in a small town. However, at the beginning of the fifth season, Schwahn advanced the timeline by four years to show their lives after college. This season featured a new storyline supported by flashbacks to their college years. Later, Schwahn made it jump a further fourteen months from the end of the sixth to the start of the seventh season. The opening credits were originally accompanied by the song "I Don't Want to Be" by Gavin DeGraw. The theme was removed from the opening in the fifth season; Schwahn said that this was to lower production costs, to add more time for the storyline, and because he felt that the song was more representative of the core characters' adolescent past than their present maturity. The credits then consisted only of the title written on a black background. The theme was restored for season 8, in response to audience demand, and was sung by different artists each week.

The series premiered to 2.5million viewers and rose to 3.3million in its second week, becoming one of only three shows to rise in their second episode during the 2003–2004 television season. Season one went on to average 3.5million viewers, and the second season was the highest rated in the series, averaging 4.3million viewers weekly and a 1.9 Adults 18–49 rating. The series received numerous award nominations, winning two Teen Choice Awards.

On May 12, 2009, it was confirmed that Murray and Hilarie Burton (Peyton) had declined to return for the seventh season, although accounts of what transpired vary. Their characters (Lucas and Peyton) had been two of the five main protagonists, and had provided one of its central love stories, throughout the show. On May 17, 2011, The CW renewed One Tree Hill for a ninth and final season, placing an order for 13 episodes. Bethany Joy Lenz (Haley) and Sophia Bush (Brooke) were signed as full-time regulars for one final season, and Lafferty appeared as a part-time regular. Murray returned for a special appearance during the final season, which premiered on January 11, 2012. The show is the fourth-longest-running series on The CW network, or the networks that came together to make it up (The WB and UPN), after Smallville, 7th Heaven, and Supernatural. The series concluded on April 4, 2012.

Series overview
Set in the fictional North Carolina coastal town of Tree Hill, the main storyline in the early seasons is the relationship between two half-brothers, Lucas and Nathan Scott, who start out as enemies but bond as the show progresses. The show starts out with Lucas becoming a member of the Tree Hill Ravens (the high school basketball team) with the help of his uncle Keith. Nathan, team captain, is threatened by this and it becomes the basis of their rivalry, also fueled by Lucas's romantic interest in Nathan's girlfriend, Peyton Sawyer. Later on, Brooke Davis, Peyton's best friend, tries to date Lucas, while Nathan attempts to date Lucas's best friend Haley James. The character of Lucas and Nathan's father Dan Scott is occasionally explored throughout, including his relationships with Karen Roe, Lucas's mother, and Deb Scott, Nathan's mother, and how he ended up with one woman rather than the other, thus abandoning Lucas as his son.

Episodes

Cast and characters

Production

Conception
Schwahn originally planned to make One Tree Hill a feature length film with the title Ravens, the name of the show's high school basketball team. However, he became convinced that it would be more interesting as a television series.}}

The show's other prominent pairing, Nathan and Haley, were considered a supercouple.<ref name="Onetreehillweb.net">{{cite news |url=http://onetreehillweb.net/media/jlafferty.html |title=OTHWEB.net EXCLUSIVE!! Interview with James Lafferty: Why do you think Nathan & Haley (Naley) have become One Tree Hill'''s "super couple"? |access-date=September 9, 2007 |archive-url=https://web.archive.org/web/20070927211335/http://onetreehillweb.net/media/jlafferty.html |archive-date=September 27, 2007 |url-status=live |work=onetreehillweb.net}}</ref> James Lafferty, Nathan's portrayer, said, "Well Schwahn always says that he had that sort of as an 'ace in the hole' the entire time. As he was writing the pilot script, he was planning on doing that, he really didn't know how it would pan out or what would happen. But, the fans have responded so passionately towards it, and I'm not really sure why." However, Lafferty has said that there is a genuine relationship between Nathan and Haley: "It started as something sort of based on betrayal and deceit. It then kind of transgressed over into something based on actual true love. So, I think that it's a transition that the fans really bought into, and I think that people really enjoy to watch." Schwahn called the couple "gold" and said, "I love Nathan and Haley, and most of our audience does as well." He said that Nathan and Haley's fan base is strong because they have always been the most stable couple on the show, admitting that it confuses him when people ask when he is going to let them be happy. "They have a lot of obstacles come their way," said Schwahn, "but I see them growing – especially with the jump [the four years that elapse between seasons 4 and 5] ahead and aging them a little bit – I see them growing into some really great places, not only as individuals, but as a family."

 Reception 

Critical receptionCosmopolitan and Digital Spy listed the series as one of the greatest teen dramas of all time, while TheWrap named it one of the shows that can be watched at any age. The first season received mixed reviews. Critics compared it to The O.C. and Dawson's Creek, but with a more masculine appeal. "Where Dawson's was about relationships, especially between boys and girls, One Tree Hill tries to be about masculinity, especially as negotiated through sports", wrote Tracy McLoone of PopMatters, who predicted that, despite this, it would probably be pinned as a girl's show. "This doesn't mean boys won't watch it, just that they won't talk about it." Allison McCracken of flowtv.org, on the other hand, called it a "boy soap opera", saying, "The new boy-centered soap employs 'feminine' generic serial elements to explore male adolescence and relationships between males, often focusing around brothers or fathers & sons" and "the boy soap is as pleasurable a text for female viewers as television offers today."

Chris Carle of IGN said: "One Tree Hill, like The O.C. is helping to infuse network television with a much-needed renaissance of teen drama. The series is a bit less fun and more dramatic than Fox's, and the themes and storylines hold a little more gravity than The O.C.'s sometimes soap opera dynamic, but it's a solid show." Keith Helinski of Moviefreak.com disagreed with The O.C. comparisons, feeling that Summerland is similar to The O.C. with its "scenarios and settings, while One Tree Hill is more suited as a Dawson's Creek knock off."The Wall Street Journal called the show "a slick prime-time drama about a small town packed with hunky teenagers and simmering family secrets," while The Star-Ledger said it was "a welcome surprise ... Every choice it makes from pacing to photography to music seems just about right, and the casting is inspired." Alynda Wheat of Entertainment Weekly called the show a "guilty pleasure" and said they had not had one "this guilty" since Melrose Place, adding that the characters' relationships change quickly. However, Wheat criticized the lack of parents in most of the teenage characters' lives. "Any time order threatens to reign, the writers ship out the parents – to Italy, a boating accident, whatever," said Wheat. AOL TV placed the show in its list of TV's Biggest Guilty Pleasures. Daniel Fienberg of Zap2it said that while the show has all the elements that make for a good show about teenagers/young adults, "it's also a show that has stubbornly refused to be categorized merely as a guilty pleasure and its myriad artistic pretensions – Lucas's Bartlett's Familiar Quotations-spewing narration, Peyton's (Hilarie Burton) pedantic lectures on indie rock, countless expositional monologues lifted from a Philosophy 101 lecture—have often rendered it merely bad, rather than so-bad-its-good". Fienberg did, however, compliment the school shooting episode. Cynthia Boris of DVD Verdict, on the other hand, said, "One Tree Hill doesn't claim to be anything more than it is. They acknowledge that they're a teen fantasy complete with an appropriately emo WB soundtrack."

Ginia Bellefante of The New York Times criticized the show's lack of insight into the consequences of teenage pregnancy, stating that "the show displays an almost aggressive aversion to moralizing about teenage pregnancy" and that by "refusing to lay out the grim consequences of premature motherhood, it seems as if it wants to make fans on either end of the political spectrum stick their heads in fiery hampers". Author Emily B. Anzicek said that pregnancy seems to be the only possible physical consequence for the residents of One Tree Hill and that discussion of STDs is non-existent, criticizing the "potential threat" due to the amount of promiscuity, such as several characters having sex with people they hardly know. "Of all the episodes in the first three seasons, there are two mentions of condoms. One happens when Deb catches Brooke and Lucas at the drug store buying condoms and whipped cream", said Anzicek. "The second happens in season two when Brooke throws a wedding reception for Nathan and Haley and decorates the room with condoms blown up like balloons." Anzicek said the teenagers, who are only supposed to be sixteen and seventeen at this time, are presented as very sexually experienced, especially Brooke, and that the one exception is Haley.

Ian Arbuckle of CHUD.com complimented the series on its musical aspects and flexibility, feeling that "One Tree Hill is firmly couched in both the pop television and pop music traditions" and that the show "doesn't focus exclusively on the teenagers, but also stretches out to include dedicated subplots for their parents and other adults." Chris Carle of IGN said, "Like the series itself, the offering is a little more adult (read: adult contemporary) and a little less fresh than other similar soundtracks. It's not without its standouts, but overall the selection is plucked from the lighter fare on alt rock radio." Arbuckle stated that the show adds division between the teenagers and adults by having the teenagers focus on love and the adults focus on revenge. One of the audience's main concerns had been which girl Lucas would end up with.

Writing for DVD Verdict, Neal Solon commended the series' first season for being about more than betrayal and questionable morals, and instead highlighting the impact of the parents' mistakes on the teenagers' lives, which was something he identified as lacking in other teen shows. He felt that the season 1 finale was strong partly because its creators did not know if the WB would renew the show. "The last few episodes bring some form of closure to the major story arcs, while leaving the door wide open for further development should the show continue. It is an artfully employed strategy that paid off", he said.

Although season 2 is the show's highest-rated season, it was also criticized. The complaints include the loss of basketball, confusion over which girl Lucas should end up with, stereotypical backstabbing and plotting and Dan being turned into an almost cartoon-ish villain. Arbuckle said, "Dan is a jealous man, and the writers come dangerously close to making him nothing more than an evil man." Amy Kane of Film.com called the character "the most ridiculous villain never to twirl a mustache". Although Arbuckle called the plot-level elements satisfying, he criticized the dialogue, saying that the writers fail to convince with the slang or Black English of the teenagers, or the language of businessmen. He credited male viewers with watching partly for the physically attractive girls. One of the more complimented additions to season 2 was character Anna Taggaro, credited by AfterEllen.com as the first recurring bisexual character of color on television; some fans, however, debated whether the character was bisexual or gay.

TheCinemaSource.com said the show's third season dialogue is "clever and sarcastic from the last word of a scene to the very first of the next" and complimented "Dan's witty comeback lines". By the fourth season, the show had shifted to melodrama. The fifth season's timeline skip, showing the characters in their lives after high school and college, was successful, and is thought to have successfully avoided jumping the shark; viewership also returned to an all-time high. BuddyTV's Don Williams said, "The fifth season of One Tree Hill completely reinvented the series. ... It was a risky move, but one that ultimately paid off." Conversely, Ginia Bellefante of The New York Times stated, "Not one of the newly minted 22-year-olds on One Tree Hill blogs or dresses coolly or speaks cleverly or gives any indication of having learned anything at all in college." She characterized the portrayal of twenty-somethings as "so wildly inauthentic and unfamiliar as to make watching it feel like foreign correspondence", but added that the show was "a no-arrogance, no-entitlement zone" and that she was content to continue watching it.

U.S. television ratings
The series premiere was watched by 2.5million viewers and achieved a 1.9 Adults 18–49 rating on September 23, 2003. The following week, it rose to 3.3million and a 2.4 demographic, becoming one of the three shows to rise in its second episode in the 2003–2004 TV season.

The CW only attracts a fraction of the audience its competitors do. "So the strategy is super-serving a young coveted demographics. The network's sweet spot is women 18–34 and with a viewer median age of 33, it boasts the youngest audience among its broadcast competitors by almost a dozen years." Averaging 4.3million viewers weekly, season two was One Tree Hill's highest-rated season. During this season, the show emerged as one of The WB's hits. "Of all the shows that they've launched in the last two years, this one has the most traction", said Stacey Lynn Koerner, at the time an executive vice president at Initiative, a media planning agency. "It does have an audience it's connecting with – a loyal audience that comes back week in and week out." The show was particularly popular among the young viewership. It became the first choice of prime-time television for teenage girls and was reported in January 2005 to be the program in Tuesday's 9 pm time slot most viewed by women aged 12 to 34.

The series finale was the highest rated among women 18–34 (1.4/4) for The CW in more than a year. It was The CW's best Wednesday night in adults 18–34 since premiere week which took place on September 14, 2011, and best adults 18–49 and women 18–49 ratings since December 7, 2011. Comparing to a year earlier, One Tree Hills last episode was up 50% in adults 18–34, 40% in women 18–34 and 33% in adults 18–49. The first hour of the finale event, a series of interviews with the cast, garnered approximately 1.37million viewers, with 1.42million tuning in for the actual series finale.

Below are the seasonal rankings (based on average total viewers per episode) of One Tree Hill on The WB and The CW.

 Awards and accolades 
Over its 9-year run, One Tree Hill has been nominated for and won various awards, most commonly being honored by the Teen Choice Awards.

Release
On February 7, 2007, Soapnet announced that it would broadcast reruns of The O.C. and One Tree Hill. The deal, made with the show's production company Warner Brothers, stated that Soapnet retained the option of picking up the fifth season for syndication. Soapnet did so, starting to air season 5 episodes in January 2009.

In India, One Tree Hill premiered on Star World India on February 27, 2013. Star World India aired seasons 1 to 7 of the show at 10 pm on weekdays and season 8 and 9 at 7 pm on weekdays. One Tree Hill ended its run on Star World India on November 14, 2013. In Australia, One Tree Hill premiered on the Nine Network in December 2003, but the channel pulled the show after 3 episodes due to low ratings. It was subsequently picked up by Network Ten, with the channel airing seasons 1–2 and 4–6 with re-runs airing on both Network Ten and its Digital channel "Eleven". The show was aired in its entirety (Seasons 1–9) on the paid service, Foxtel on the Arena channel. In Philippines, One Tree Hill premiered on RPN on March 7, 2007.

The entire series was available on internet streaming service Netflix until October 1, 2017.

It was announced on January 17, 2018, that the entire One Tree Hill series would be available on Hulu starting February 1, 2018.

Home media
Seasons 1–9 of One Tree Hill'' were released on DVD in regions 1, 2 and 4, with commentary on selected episodes by cast and crew members, deleted scenes, gag reels and featurettes. Four box set collectors' editions were released: the first in August 2009 containing the complete seasons 1–6, and the second in August 2010 containing seasons 1–7 and in 2011 seasons 1–8. On May 12, 2012, the upcoming availability of a complete box set of the entire series was announced; it was released on June 11, 2012. This box set was initially for sale in the UK only; however, the set became available in Australia on October 31, 2012.

Notes

References

External links

 One Tree Hill at Warner Bros. TV
 

 
2000s American high school television series 
2003 American television series debuts
2000s American teen drama television series
2010s American teen drama television series 
2010s American high school television series
2012 American television series endings
American television soap operas 
Basketball television series
English-language television shows
Coming-of-age television shows
Fashion-themed television series 
North Carolina culture
Serial drama television series
Teenage pregnancy in television
Television series by Tollin/Robbins Productions
Television series by Warner Bros. Television Studios
Television shows filmed in North Carolina
Television shows filmed in Wilmington, North Carolina
Television shows set in North Carolina
The CW original programming
The WB original programming
Television series about brothers
Television series about teenagers